Wistar may refer to:

 Caspar Wistar (1696–1752), Pennsylvania glassmaker and landowner.
 Caspar Wistar (1761–1818), physician and anatomist, grandson of the glassmaker.
 Isaac J. Wistar (1827-1905), Union general and penologist.
 Wistar Institute, a biomedical research center in Philadelphia, Pennsylvania, named after the physician.
 Wistar rat, a strain of albino laboratory rats developed at the institute.
 Mount Wistar, a mountain in Greenland

See also
Wister (disambiguation)